Israel's Arab Warriors is a BBC Arabic documentary shot over six months by a team that gained extraordinary access to the Gadsar - the all-Arab unit of (500 and growing) of the Israeli Defence Force.

The BBC documentary on Arab soldiers in the Israeli army aired to over 10 million Arabic speaking homes. For the first time, the BBC's Arabic service broadcast a documentary focusing on Israel's minority Arab population and the growing number who are voluntarily serving in the Israel Defense Forces. In the film, Senior BBC Reporter Jane Corbin follows the first all Arab unit of the Israeli Defense Forces to be deployed inside the West Bank, as well as others serving in integrated units with Jewish soldiers.

The documentary was commissioned by BBC Arabic. The presence of Arab soldiers in the IDF has caused some controversy. Currently there are ten times as many Israeli Arabs - Muslims and Christians - joining the IDF compared to three years ago.

The director of the documentary, Oren Rosenfeld, says he thinks that the Arab world will be surprised to see Arabs, both Muslim and Christian soldiers, fighting for Israel against other Arabs.

References

External links

 

Documentary films about the Arab–Israeli conflict
2016 television films
2016 films
BBC Film films
British documentary films

Films about the Israel Defense Forces
2010s British films